The 2016 Denver Pioneers men's soccer team represented the University of Denver during the 2016 NCAA Division I men's soccer season. The Pioneers played in Summit League where they won the regular season and conference tournament titles. They finished the regular season as one of only two unbeaten teams, the other being top-ranked Maryland.

The Pioneers qualified for the NCAA Tournament for the fourth straight season and their seventh overall time. The Pioneers earned a Second Round-bye and were seeded sixth in the tournament. In the second round, they played the UNLV Rebels where they won 3–0, marking their first NCAA Tournament win since 1970. They then defeated Washington 2–1 at home and third-seeded Clemson 1–0 on the road to advance to the school's first-ever College Cup.

Roster 

As of 19 November 2016

Schedule 

|-
!colspan=6 style="background:#8B2332; color:#EAD4AA;"| Exhibitions
|-

|-
!colspan=6 style="background:#8B2332; color:#EAD4AA;"| Regular Season
|-

|-

|-

|-

|-

|-

|-

|-

|-

|-

|-

|-

|-

|-

|-

|-

|-

|-

|-
!colspan=6 style="background:#8B2332; color:#EAD4AA;"| The Summit Tournament
|-

|-

|-
!colspan=6 style="background:#8B2332; color:#EAD4AA;"| NCAA Tournament
|-

|-

Rankings

References 

Denver Pioneers
Denver Pioneers men's soccer seasons
Denver Pioneers, Soccer
Denver Pioneers
NCAA Division I Men's Soccer Tournament College Cup seasons